Dion Frazer (born February 17, 1981 in Belmopan) is a former Belizean professional football striker.

He was a regular choice for the Belize national football team.

International career
Frazer made his debut for Belize in a May 2000 FIFA World Cup qualification match against Guatemala and earned a total of 8 caps, scoring 5 goals.
He has represented Belize in 2 FIFA World Cup qualification matches and played at the UNCAF Nations Cup 2001.

His final international was a January 2008 friendly match against El Salvador.

International goals
Scores and results list Belize's goal tally first.

References

External links

1981 births
Living people
People from Belmopan
Belizean footballers
Belize international footballers
New Site Erei players
Association football forwards
Verdes FC players